Attorney General Bushnell may refer to:

Robert T. Bushnell (1896–1949), Attorney General of Massachusetts
Washington Bushnell (1825–1885), Attorney General of Illinois